The Fr. Bellarmine Baltasar Gymnasium (also known as the San Beda College Alabang Gym) is a gymnasium within San Beda College Alabang in Muntinlupa, Philippines. It has a seating capacity of 1,200 for sporting events and a full house capacity of 5,560.

Within the gymnasium are two full-sized basketball courts, volleyball courts and an event stage. It is also the location of the school's athletic offices. With the assumption of Dom Clement Ma. H. Roque, OSB as the eighth rector-president, the gymnasium was renovated. During the 2015-2016 school year, the San Beda College Alabang Gym was officially renamed in honor of the school's fourth rector-president, Fr. Bellarmine Baltasar, OSB, who was the rector-president of the school from 1985 to 1995.

The gymnasium underwent its first major renovation in 2019 under the leadership of Rev. Fr. Gerardo Ma. De Villa, OSB in preparation for the school's hosting of the NCAA South Season 21.

Events

Sporting events
Frequently a venue for sporting events of the National Collegiate Athletic Association (South) and the Women's National Collegiate Athletic Association, Men's National Collegiate Athletic Association and is the home of the San Beda College Alabang Red Lions, San Beda College Alabang's varsity teams. Coach Eric Altamirano's basketball clinic has been doing its program here since 2012 as well as the Complete Basketball Camp in 2014.

Other uses
It serves as the main athletics academic facility and is used for most in-school events, including non-athletic ones. This includes Moving Up Ceremonies, Cultural Event Shows, Integration, the famous Batch Cheering, and other inter-school activities. The school's annual Bodega Sale has been held here until 2015 when their Baratillo Sale replaced it from 2016 onwards.

In 2015, The gym hosted the practices and preparations of the Pope Francis's visit to the Philippines with students coming from different schools within the Diocese of Paranaque.

On September 2, 2016, the Motorcycle Development Program Participants Association (MDPPA) held their road safety advocacy activities here.

The gymnasium has also been used as a polling station during the 2010 Philippine presidential elections and again during the 2016 Philippine presidential elections.

See also
List of indoor arenas in the Philippines

References

San Beda University
National Collegiate Athletic Association
Sports venues in Metro Manila
Educational structures in Metro Manila
Indoor arenas in the Philippines
Basketball venues in the Philippines
Buildings and structures in Muntinlupa